Seawell is a town located in the province of Christ Church, Barbados.

References 

Populated places in Barbados